The  Chicago Rush season was the sixth season for the franchise. They won ArenaBowl XX in 2006 with a 7–9 record. They defeated the Orlando Predators.

Final roster

Chicago Rush
Chicago Rush seasons
Chicago Rush
ArenaBowl champion seasons